Army Medical Museums:

 Army Medical Services Museum – United Kingdom
 National Museum of Health and Medicine – United States of America
 Russian Museum of Military Medicine